Golzow is a municipality in the Potsdam-Mittelmark district, in Brandenburg, Germany.

Within the municipality is a large forest, the Golzower Busch.

Demography

References

Localities in Potsdam-Mittelmark